Pseudo-Chrysostom is the designation used for the anonymous authors of texts falsely attributed to John Chrysostom (died 407). Most such works are sermons, since a large number of John's actual sermons survive.

Several works written by heretics were attributed to Chrysostom, which has ensured their survival. They are an important witness to the spirituality and mindset of certain heretical movements of the 4th and 5th centuries. Three Easter sermons of Pseudo-Chrysostom are thought to be by Apollinaris of Laodicea, the 4th-century opponent of Arianism who lapsed into the heresy that bears his name, Apollinarism. Two sermons for the octave of Easter have been identified as written by an Anomoean. These works are in Greek. The Opus imperfectum in Matthaeum, a series of sermons on the Gospel of Matthew, were written  in Latin by an Arian bishop in the 5th or 6th century.

The Pseudo-Chrysostom sermon on the glorious cross, In venerabilem crucem sermo, was widely copied in its original Greek and also translated into Armenian, Latin, Old Nubian, Old Russian (East Slavic) and Syriac. The Old Nubian text is the longest surviving text in that language. The Pseudo-Chrysostom sermon on the archangel Raphael, In Raphaelem archangelum, was also translated, revised and expanded in Arabic, Ge'ez (Ethiopic) and Old Nubian.

Several sermons on Job have been attributed to Chrysostom but were in fact written by Severian of Gabala.

Notes

Sources

External links
Homilies of Pseudo-John Chrysostom, a list of Pseudo-Chrysostom sermons in Syriac and Christian Palestinian Aramaic

Pseudepigraphy
Arianism